Carex ovalis can refer to:

Carex ovalis , a synonym of Carex leporina 
Carex ovalis , a synonym of Carex scoparia